Christos Kafezas (born January 9, 2002) is a Greek professional basketball player for Axagia 82 of the Greek 3rd division. He is a 1.89m (6'2.5in) tall point guard-shooting guard.

Professional career
In June 2019, Kafezas began his pro career with the Greek Basket League club Promitheas Patras, in a game against Panathinaikos, becoming the first ever player born in Patras to play in a Greek Finals Game during the 2018–19 season. In October 2019, he made his debut in one of the two European-wide secondary level competitions, the EuroCup, in a game against Maccabi Rishon LeZion, during the 2019–20 season

References

External links
EuroCup Profile
Eurobasket.com Profile
Greek Basket League Profile 
Greek Basket League Profile 
RealGM.com Profile
ProBallers.com Profile

2002 births
Living people
Greek men's basketball players
Point guards
Promitheas Patras B.C. players
Shooting guards